The Mercedes-Benz O303 was an integral coach manufactured by Mercedes-Benz between 1974 and 1992. It was also available as a chassis, where the customer could choose to get the lower part of the front or even the entire front including the windscreen from the integral model shipped with the chassis.

History
The Mercedes-Benz O303 was launched in 1974 at the Paris Motor Show as a replacement for the O302. In 1985, the O303 was the first bus to offer anti-lock braking.

Over 33,000 O303s were built over an eighteen-year period. It was superseded by the O404.

Models

Gallery

References

External links

303
Vehicles introduced in 1974
Coaches (bus)